Talustan (also Romanized as Talūstān; also known as Taldastān) is a village in Yanqaq Rural District in the Central District of Galikash County, Golestan Province, Iran. At the 2006 census, its population was 591, in 142 families.

References 

Populated places in Galikash County